Nicky Henson ( Nicholas Victor Leslie Henson; 12 May 1945 – 15 December 2019) was a British actor.

Early life
Nicholas Victor Leslie Henson was born in London, the son of Harriet Martha ( Collins) and comedian Leslie Henson. Adam Henson, a farmer and regular presenter on BBC TV's Countryfile, is the son of Nicky's brother, Joe Henson.

He attended St. Bede's Prep School, Eastbourne, and Charterhouse in Godalming. He trained as a stage manager at RADA, and first appeared on stage himself as a guitarist. As a member of the Young Vic Company he played Pozzo in Samuel Beckett's Waiting for Godot.

Career

Television
Henson appeared in various television roles, including guest roles in Fawlty Towers, Minder, Boon, Inspector Morse, A Touch of Frost, Heartbeat, After You've Gone, Lovejoy and Doctors. In 1990 he played the doctor in the BBC’s  adaptation of Kingsley Amis’ Ghost story The Green Man. He played the eponymous hero in Shine On Harvey Moon when the series was revived in 1995.

In 2005 he played Hugo, an antique dealer, in Bad Girls. In February 2006, Henson joined the cast of the BBC1 soap opera EastEnders, playing Jack Edwards. Henson left the production towards the end of the year due to health problems.

Henson played three different characters in the police drama series The Bill, the first in 1991, the second in 1998, and the third in 2007. In 2010, he appeared as Charles Grigg, a former acquaintance of Carson the butler, in an episode of the ITV period drama Downton Abbey and appeared in two further episodes in 2013.
He also played Randolph Mepstead, the older brother of David Jason's character in the pilot episode of the mid-1970s series Lucky Feller.

Henson played the role of Mr. Johnson in the Fawlty Towers episode "The Psychiatrist". He stated that despite his 50 years of professional acting, his tombstone will probably read "Here lies Nicky Henson – he was in one episode of Fawlty Towers". He was paid a modest appearance fee, and told he might earn the same again in repeats fees.

Films
Henson's film appearances include Witchfinder General (1968), There's a Girl in My Soup (1970), Mosquito Squadron (1970) and Psychomania (1973). He graduated to lead roles in The Bawdy Adventures of Tom Jones (1976) and  No. 1 of the Secret Service (1977), before returning to supporting roles in Vera Drake (2004) and George Clooney's Syriana (2005).

Theatre
On stage, Henson played many Shakespearean characters (including a period with the Royal Shakespeare Company from 1977) and had leading roles in Look Back in Anger, Man and Superman, Rosencrantz and Guildenstern are Dead, She Stoops to Conquer, Noises Off and others. He appeared as Mordred in the original 1964 London version of Camelot opposite Laurence Harvey as King Arthur. Henson made his Broadway debut in a production of Oscar Wilde's An Ideal Husband, opposite Stephanie Beacham. He was nominated for a 1998 Laurence Olivier Theatre Award for Best Supporting Performance in a Musical of 1997 for his role in Enter the Guardsman.

He started directing with a Restoration workshop at LAMDA with a production of The Provok'd Wife. In 2009 he directed the Jack Shepherd play Only When I Laugh at the Arcola Theatre in London and Alan Ayckbourn's Intimate Exchanges at Sheringham Little Theatre.

Radio
Henson played Lemuel "Chipper" Barnet in Space Force series 1 and 2 (1984–85).

Personal life
Henson married actress Una Stubbs (who incidentally played his sister-in-law Caroline Bishop in EastEnders). The couple had two sons, Joe and Christian, both of whom are composers. The marriage ended after Henson began an affair in 1974 with actress Susan Hampshire, his co-star in several stage productions.

He then married ballerina Marguerite Porter, by whom he had a third son, Keaton, a musician and illustrator.

Health
Henson was diagnosed with cancer in 2003. Surgeons removed tumours from around his spleen, but a routine check-up in 2006 showed that other tumours had grown and it would be dangerous to remove them. Henson was put on a regime of chemotherapy, and worked regularly to raise funds for cancer charities, especially Marie Curie Cancer Care.

He died on 15 December 2019 from cancer, aged 74.

Partial filmography

 1964 Father Came Too! as Motorcyclist
 1965 Every Day's a Holiday as Tailor's Shop Customer (uncredited)
 1966 Doctor in Clover as Boutique Assistant
 1967 The Jokers as Man At Party
 1968 Here We Go Round the Mulberry Bush as Craig Foster
 1968 30 Is a Dangerous Age, Cynthia as Paul
 1968 Witchfinder General as Swallow
 1969 Crooks and Coronets as Lord Freddie Fitzmore
 1969 Mosquito Squadron as Flight Sergeant Wiley Bunce
 1970 There's a Girl in My Soup as Jimmy
 1972 All Coppers Are... as Barry
 1973 Psychomania as Tom Latham
 1973 The Love Ban as Baker
 1973 Penny Gold as Roger
 1974 Vampira as Marc
 1974 Bedtime with Rosie as Fantasy Man
 1976 The Bawdy Adventures of Tom Jones as Tom Jones
 1977 No. 1 of the Secret Service as No. 1 / Charles Bind
 1985 The Secret of Seagull Island as Martin Foster
 1988 Star Trap as Adam Blunt
 1998 Parting Shots as Askew
 2001 Me Without You as Ray
 2001 Death, Deceit & Destiny Aboard the Orient Express as Tom Finlay
 2002 Flyfishing as Howard
 2004 Vera Drake as Private Doctor
 2005 Syriana as Sydney Hewitt
 2006 A Quiet Drink (Short) as Peter
 2011 Blitz as Superintendent Brown
 2011 Truth or Dare as Mr. Hautbois (uncredited)
 2012 Run for Your Wife as Man In Hospital
 2014 We Still Kill the Old Way as Jack Houghton
 2015 Draw on Sweet Night as Sir Thomas Kytson
 2015 Narcopolis as Chief Ballard
 2016 Gozo as Tony
 2016 We Still Steal the Old Way as Jack Houghton
 2017 The Holly Kane Experiment as Marvin Greenslade
 2018 Tango One as Latham (final film role)

References

External links
 
  Nicky Henson(Aveleyman)

1945 births
2019 deaths
Male actors from London
Alumni of RADA
English male film actors
English male radio actors
English male soap opera actors
English male stage actors
People educated at St. Bede's Prep School
People educated at Charterhouse School
Deaths from cancer
Royal Shakespeare Company members
20th-century English male actors
21st-century English male actors